Oluwale Bamgbose (born August 4, 1987) is a Nigerian-American mixed martial artist who most recently competed in the Middleweight division of the Ultimate Fighting Championship.

Education 
Oluwale was raised by traditional parents who were very strict. While growing up, Oluwale's parents instilled and encouraged high standards in education and values in Christianity. Oluwale credits God and his parents for his assertive understanding of what it takes to succeed in life. Bamgbose began training in karate at the age of 12 before later transitioning to Taekwondo.

Oluwale currently holds an associate degree in Liberal Arts from SUNY Morrisville, a bachelor's degree in "Child and Family Studies" from SUNY Oneonta and a master's degree in "Public Administration" from Alfred University. It was during his time in college that Bamgbose began training in mixed martial arts.

Mixed martial arts career
After competing as an amateur for one year and compiling a record of 2-1, Bamgbose made his professional debut in June 2013. While competing exclusively for the regional promotion Ring of Combat, he amassed a record of 5-0, finishing all of his opponents in the first round before signing with the Ultimate Fighting Championship in the summer of 2015.

Ultimate Fighting Championship
Bamgbose made his promotional debut as a short notice replacement against Uriah Hall on August 8, 2015 at UFC Fight Night 73. Bamgbose lost the fight by TKO in the first round.

Bamgbose next faced Daniel Sarafian on February 21, 2016 at UFC Fight Night 83, again as a short notice replacement, filling in for an injured Sam Alvey. Bamgbose won the fight via knockout in the first round.

For a third straight fight, Bamgbose was tabbed as an injury replacement and faced Cezar Ferreira on April 16, 2016 at UFC on Fox 19, filling in for an injured Caio Magalhães. He lost the fight via unanimous decision.

Bamgbose was briefly linked to a bout with Josh Samman on December 9, 2016 at UFC Fight Night 102. However the pairing never materialized as Samman died on October 5, 2016. He was replaced by Joe Gigliotti. In turn, Bamgbose pulled out of the fight in mid-November citing an injury and was replaced by promotional newcomer Gerald Meerschaert.

Bamgbose was expected to face Tom Breese on March 18, 2017 at UFC Fight Night 107. However, the day of the event Breese was deemed unfit to compete and the bout was cancelled.

Bamgbose faced Paulo Costa on June 3, 2017 at UFC 212. He lost the back-and-forth fight via TKO in the second round.

Bamgbose faced Alessio Di Chirico on December 16, 2017 at UFC on Fox 26. He lost the fight via knockout in the second round.

Bamgbose was released from UFC on December 28, 2017.

Accomplishments 
Ring of Combat
Middleweight Champion (One defense)

Mixed martial arts record

|- 
|Loss
|align=center|6–4
|Alessio Di Chirico
|KO (knee)
|UFC on Fox: Lawler vs. dos Anjos 
|
|align=center|2
|align=center|2:14
|Winnipeg, Manitoba, Canada
|
|-
|Loss
|align=center|6–3
|Paulo Costa
|TKO (punches)
|UFC 212
|
|align=center|2
|align=center|1:06
|Rio de Janeiro, Brazil
|
|-
|Loss
|align=center|6–2
|Cezar Ferreira
|Decision (unanimous)
|UFC on Fox: Teixeira vs. Evans
|
|align=center|3
|align=center|5:00
|Tampa, Florida, United States
|
|-
|Win
|align=center|6–1
|Daniel Sarafian
|KO (head kick and punches)
|UFC Fight Night: Cowboy vs. Cowboy
|
|align=center|1
|align=center|1:00
|Pittsburgh, Pennsylvania, United States
|
|-
|Loss
|align=center| 5–1
|Uriah Hall
|TKO (punches)
|UFC Fight Night: Teixeira vs. Saint Preux
|
|align=center|1
|align=center|2:32
|Nashville, Tennessee, United States
|
|-
|Win
|align=center| 5–0
|Brian Booth
|TKO (punches)
|Ring of Combat 51
|
|align=center|1
|align=center|0:24
|Atlantic City, New Jersey, United States
|
|-
| Win
|align=center| 4–0
|Devon Morris
|TKO (head kick and punches)
|Ring of Combat 50
|
|align=center|1
|align=center|3:18
|Atlantic City, New Jersey, United States
|
|-
| Win
|align=center| 3–0
|Steve Nichols
|TKO (doctor stoppage)
|Ring of Combat 49
|
|align=center| 1
|align=center| 1:24
|Atlantic City, New Jersey, United States
|
|-
| Win
|align=center| 2–0
|Michael Elshamy
| TKO (punches)
|Ring of Combat 47
|
|align=center|1
|align=center|2:51
|Atlantic City, New Jersey, United States
|
|-
| Win
|align=center| 1–0
|Fikret Darzanoff
| TKO (punches)
|Ring of Combat 45
|
|align=center|1
|align=center|2:45
|Atlantic City, New Jersey, United States
|
|-

See also

 List of current UFC fighters
 List of male mixed martial artists

References

External links
 
 

Living people
1987 births
Alfred University alumni
African-American mixed martial artists
American male mixed martial artists
American people of Nigerian descent
American wushu practitioners
American male taekwondo practitioners
American Muay Thai practitioners
American practitioners of Brazilian jiu-jitsu
American male karateka
Middleweight mixed martial artists
Mixed martial artists from New York (state)
Mixed martial artists utilizing wushu
Mixed martial artists utilizing Muay Thai
Mixed martial artists utilizing Shotokan
Mixed martial artists utilizing taekwondo
Mixed martial artists utilizing Brazilian jiu-jitsu
Sportspeople from the Bronx
State University of New York at Oneonta alumni
Yoruba sportspeople
American people of Yoruba descent
Nigerian male mixed martial artists
Nigerian male taekwondo practitioners
Nigerian male karateka
Nigerian Muay Thai practitioners
Nigerian practitioners of Brazilian jiu-jitsu
People awarded a black belt in Brazilian jiu-jitsu
Ultimate Fighting Championship male fighters
21st-century African-American sportspeople
20th-century African-American people